Brooke Smith is an American actress, known for her roles as Dr. Erica Hahn on the ABC medical drama series Grey's Anatomy, as Sheriff Jane Greene on the A&E horror series Bates Motel, and as Catherine Martin in the 1991 film The Silence of the Lambs, along with roles in several movies and guest starring and recurring appearances in many television shows including Big Sky and Them.

Early life 
Smith was born in New York City. Her father, Eugene "Gene" Smith, worked as a publisher, and her mother, Lois Smith (publicist) (née Wollenweber), had worked with Robert Redford and other actors and directors.

Career 
Smith has appeared in numerous films, including The Moderns (1988), The Silence of the Lambs (1991), The Night We Never Met (1993), Mr. Wonderful (1993), Vanya on 42nd Street (1994), Last Summer in the Hamptons (1995), Trees Lounge (1996), Kansas City (1996), The Broken Giant (1997), Random Hearts (1999), Series 7: The Contenders (2001), Bad Company (2002), Melinda and Melinda (2004), Iron Jawed Angels (2004), Shooting Vegetarians (2005), In Her Shoes (2005), The Namesake (2006), and Interstellar (2014).

She appeared as a guest star on the sixth season of Crossing Jordan as Dr. Kate Switzer, as one of Claire Fisher's art teachers on Six Feet Under, and on Weeds as the ex-wife of Peter Scottson, the late husband of main character Nancy Botwin.

Smith originated the role of Andrea in the pilot of the ABC drama series Dirty Sexy Money, but was replaced by Sheryl Lee after becoming a series regular on Grey's Anatomy. On November 3, 2008, Smith told Entertainment Weekly that her character was being written out of Grey's Anatomy, stating that she was "really, really shocked," and suggested that network executives' discomfort with her character's lesbian relationship might be the reason for her ousting. However, Shonda Rhimes, the show's creator, said that Smith was dismissed from the series because the writers did not find that the "magic and chemistry" that Smith's character had with Sara Ramirez's character, Callie Torres, would sustain in the long run.

Smith has also had roles on Homicide: Life on the Street, Law & Order: Special Victims Unit, Law & Order: Criminal Intent, Law & Order, Criminal Minds and The Hunger. In 2012, Smith also appeared in the American Horror Story: Asylum episode "The Coat Hanger". In 2015, she appeared as Frances Simpson on the Showtime drama series Ray Donovan.

In 2016, Smith appeared in the recurring role of Sheriff Jane Greene in the fifth and final season of A&E's Bates Motel, a prequel series to director Alfred Hitchcock's 1960 horror classic Psycho.

In 2019, Smith portrayed Dara, a counselor assigned to a young rape victim, in Episode 7 of Unbelievable. It was released on September 13 on Netflix.

In 2020, she began a recurring role on the ABC series Big Sky.

Advocacy
On August 27, 2008, Smith spoke at an "Open the Debates" rally in Denver, Colorado, opposing the Commission on Presidential Debates exclusion of third party candidates from the nationally televised presidential debates, and in support of Independent Presidential candidate Ralph Nader.

Personal life 
Smith married Russian cinematographer Steve Lubensky on January 6, 1999. Their daughter, Fanny Grace Lubensky, was born in New York City. In May 2008, the couple adopted a baby girl, Lucy Dinknesh Lubensky, from Ethiopia. The family lives in New York's Upper West Side, and in Beachwood Canyon, Los Angeles. She was once roommates with singer Jeff Buckley

Books 
Sunday Matinee: Photographs by Brooke Smith (Radio Raheem, 2022)

Filmography

Film

Television

References

External links 
 

20th-century American actresses
21st-century American actresses
Actresses from New York City
American Academy of Dramatic Arts alumni
American film actresses
American television actresses
Living people
People from Blauvelt, New York
Year of birth missing (living people)